Ana Isabel de Alba (born 1979) is an American attorney who serves as a United States district judge of the United States District Court for the Eastern District of California.

Early life and education 
de Alba was born in Merced and raised in Dos Palos, California. She earned a Bachelor of Arts degree from the University of California, Berkeley in 2002 and a Juris Doctor from the UC Berkeley School of Law in 2007.

Career 

de Alba worked with the ACLU Immigrants' Rights Project in San Francisco, California, in 2007.  From 2007 to 2013, de Alba was an associate at Lang Richet & Patch in Fresno.  In 2013, she was promoted to partner, where her practice focused on torts, employment law, and construction law. In October 2018, Governor Jerry Brown appointed her as a judge of the Fresno County Superior Court to fill the seat left vacant by the retirement of Judge Dale Ikeda.

Federal judicial service 
On January 19, 2022, President Joe Biden nominated de Alba to serve as a United States district judge of the United States District Court for the Eastern District of California. President Biden nominated her to the seat vacated by Judge Morrison C. England Jr., who assumed senior status on December 17, 2019. On April 27, 2022, a hearing on her nomination was held before the committee. On May 26, 2022, her nomination was reported out of committee by a 12–10 vote. On June 16, 2022, the United States Senate invoked cloture on her nomination by a 52–43 vote. On June 21, 2022, her nomination was confirmed by a 53–45 vote. She received her judicial commission on July 7, 2022, and was sworn in on July 8.

Personal life 

de Alba is a Democrat.

See also 
List of Hispanic/Latino American jurists

References

External links 

1979 births
Living people
21st-century American judges
21st-century American lawyers
21st-century American women judges
California Democrats
California lawyers
California state court judges
Hispanic and Latino American judges
Hispanic and Latino American lawyers
Judges of the United States District Court for the Eastern District of California
People from Fresno County, California
People from Merced, California
Superior court judges in the United States
UC Berkeley School of Law alumni
United States district court judges appointed by Joe Biden
University of California, Berkeley alumni